Polonium-210 (210Po, Po-210, historically radium F) is an isotope of polonium. It undergoes alpha decay to stable 206Pb with a half-life of 138.376 days (about  months), the longest half-life of all naturally occurring polonium isotopes. First identified in 1898, and also marking the discovery of the element polonium, 210Po is generated in the decay chain of uranium-238 and radium-226. 210Po is a prominent contaminant in the environment, mostly affecting seafood and tobacco. Its extreme toxicity is attributed to intense radioactivity, capable of severely harming humans.

History

In 1898, Marie and Pierre Curie discovered a strongly radioactive substance in pitchblende and determined that it was a new element; it was one of the first radioactive elements discovered. Having identified it as such, they named the element polonium after Marie's home country, Poland. Willy Marckwald discovered a similar radioactive activity in 1902 and named it radio-tellurium, and at roughly the same time, Ernest Rutherford identified the same activity in his analysis of the uranium decay chain and named it radium F (originally radium E). By 1905, Rutherford concluded that all these observations were due to the same substance, 210Po. Further discoveries and the concept of isotopes, first proposed in 1913 by Frederick Soddy, firmly placed 210Po as the penultimate step in the uranium series.

In 1943, 210Po was studied as a possible neutron initiator in nuclear weapons, as part of the Dayton Project. In subsequent decades, concerns for the safety of workers handling 210Po led to extensive studies on its health effects.

In the 1950s, scientists of the United States Atomic Energy Commission at Mound Laboratories, Ohio explored the possibility of using 210Po in radioisotope thermoelectric generators (RTGs) as a heat source to power satellites. A 2.5-watt atomic battery using 210Po was developed by 1958. However, the isotope plutonium-238 was chosen instead, as it has a longer half-life of 87.7 years.

Polonium-210 was used to kill Russian dissident and ex-FSB officer Alexander V. Litvinenko in 2006, and was suspected as a possible cause of Yasser Arafat's death, following exhumation and analysis of his corpse in 2012–2013.

Decay properties
210Po is an alpha emitter that has a half-life of 138.376 days; it decays directly to stable 206Pb. The majority of the time, 210Po decays by emission of an alpha particle only, not by emission of an alpha particle and a gamma ray; about one in 100,000 decays results in the emission of a gamma ray. This low gamma ray production rate makes it more difficult to find and identify this isotope. Rather than gamma ray spectroscopy, alpha spectroscopy is the best method of measuring this isotope.

Owing to its much shorter half-life, a milligram of 210Po emits as many alpha particles per second as 5 grams of 226Ra. A few curies of 210Po emit a blue glow caused by excitation of surrounding air.

210Po occurs in minute amounts in nature, where it is the penultimate isotope in the uranium series decay chain. It is generated via beta decay from 210Pb and 210Bi.

The astrophysical s-process is terminated by the decay of 210Po, as the neutron flux is insufficient to lead to further neutron captures in the short lifetime of 210Po. Instead, 210Po alpha decays to 206Pb, which then captures more neutrons to become 210Po and repeats the cycle, thus consuming the remaining neutrons. This results in a buildup of lead and bismuth, and ensures that heavier elements such as thorium and uranium are only produced in the much faster r-process.

Production

Deliberate
Although 210Po occurs in trace amounts in nature, it is not abundant enough (0.1 ppb) for extraction from uranium ore to be feasible. Instead, most 210Po is produced synthetically, through neutron bombardment of 209Bi in a nuclear reactor. This process converts 209Bi to 210Bi, which beta decays to 210Po with a five-day half-life.

Byproduct
The production of polonium-210 is a downside to reactors cooled with lead-bismuth eutectic rather than pure lead, however, given the eutectic properties of this alloy, some proposed Generation IV reactor designs still rely on lead-bismuth.

Applications
A single gram of 210Po generates 140 watts of power. Because it emits many alpha particles, which are stopped within a very short distance in dense media and release their energy, 210Po has been used as a lightweight heat source to power thermoelectric cells in artificial satellites; for instance, a 210Po heat source was also in each of the Lunokhod rovers deployed on the surface of the Moon, to keep their internal components warm during the lunar nights. Some anti-static brushes, used for neutralizing static electricity on materials like photographic film, contain a few microcuries of 210Po as a source of charged particles. 210Po was also used in initiators for atomic bombs through the (α,n) reaction with beryllium. Small neutron sources reliant on the (α,n) reaction also usually use polonium as a convenient source of alpha particles due to its comparatively low gamma emissions (allowing easy shielding) and high specific activity.

Hazards

210Po is extremely toxic; it and other polonium isotopes are some of the most radiotoxic substances to humans. With one microgram being more than enough to kill the average adult, 210Po is 250,000 times more toxic than hydrogen cyanide by weight; it is also thought that one gram of 210Po is enough to kill 50 million people and sicken another 50 million. This is a consequence of its ionizing alpha radiation, as alpha particles are especially damaging to organic tissues inside the body. However, 210Po does not pose a radiation hazard when contained outside the body. The alpha particles it produces cannot penetrate the outer layer of dead skin cells.

The toxicity of 210Po stems entirely from its radioactivity. It is not chemically toxic in itself, but its solubility in aqueous solution as well as that of its salts poses a hazard because its spread throughout the body is facilitated in solution. Intake of 210Po occurs primarily through contaminated air, food, or water, as well as through open wounds. Once inside the body, 210Po concentrates in soft tissues (especially in the reticuloendothelial system) and the bloodstream. Its biological half-life is approximately 50 days.

In the environment, 210Po can accumulate in seafood. It has been detected in various organisms in the Baltic Sea, where it can propagate in, and thus contaminate, the food chain. 210Po is also known to contaminate vegetation, primarily originating from the decay of atmospheric radon-222 and absorption from soil.

In particular, 210Po attaches to, and concentrates in, tobacco leaves. Elevated concentrations of 210Po in tobacco were documented as early as 1964, and cigarette smokers were thus found to be exposed to considerably greater doses of radiation from 210Po and its parent 210Pb. Heavy smokers may be exposed to the same amount of radiation (estimates vary from 100 µSv to 160 mSv per year) as individuals in Poland were from Chernobyl fallout traveling from Ukraine. As a result, 210Po is most dangerous when inhaled from cigarette smoke, providing further evidence for a link between smoking and lung cancer.

References

Isotopes of polonium
Carcinogens
Tobacco
Radioisotope fuels